sḏm-ꜥš m st mꜣꜥt, usually translated as Servant in the Place of Truth is an ancient Egyptian title that is used to refer to someone who worked in the Theban Necropolis, on the west bank of the Nile in Thebes. Set-Maat ( "Place of Truth") was the name of the workmen's settlement today known as Deir el-Medina. Several artisans had nicely decorated tombs here.

Notable persons and their tombs

 Amenmose – TT9
 Khabekhnet – TT2
 Khawy – TT214
 Neferabet – TT5
 Pashedu – TT3
 Penamun – TT213
 Penbuy and Kasa – TT10
 Qen – TT4
 Sennedjem – TT1
 Sennefer – 1159a

References

External links 

 Images of Deir el-Medina : Past & Present

Ancient Egyptian titles